Bluebird Foods Ltd is a New Zealand division of the U.S.-based PepsiCo corporation, that manufactures snack foods, cereals and muesli bars.  All snacks are manufactured at the Bluebird Foods factory in Wiri, Auckland.

History

Originally part of Goodman Fielder, and then bought by Graeme Hart's Burns, Philp & Co, Bluebird Foods was purchased by snack-food and beverage giant PepsiCo for NZ$245m in July 2006.  Prior to that, Burns Philp tried to sell Bluebird Foods to Nestlé with the Uncle Tobys sale. Nestlé was not interested and bought only Uncle Tobys business. In October 2005, Bluebird Foods acquired Krispa and Aztec from Hansells NZ. This made Bluebird Foods one of the largest snack food manufacturers in New Zealand. May 2006 saw Nestlé purchase the Uncle Tobys brand for NZ$1.1 billion. Bluebird Foods was able to use the Uncle Tobys brand until May 2007.

Later in 2008, the company starting using foil to wrap most of their chips instead of the soft plastic material previously used. However, the soft plastic material is still used for corn snacks, such as Twisties, Burger Rings and Rashuns.

Marketing
In 2009, Bluebird Foods teamed up with The Rock radio station and rebranded "The People's Chip" campaign from Australia’s radio presenter duo Hamish & Andy.
In Australia, the chip flavour as voted for by listeners was gravy, while in New Zealand the flavour selected was marmite and cheese – a flavour already produced by Walkers in the UK, who have the same parent company as Bluebird Foods.

Brands

Current brands

 Bluebird Original Cut Chips — ready salted/chicken/salt & vinegar/sour cream & chives/green onion
 Burger Rings — corn snacks
 Cheezels — cheese corn snacks
Copper Kettle — potato chips
 Delisio
 Doritos
 Cheetos
 Grain Waves (multigrain chips)
 Lay's — made in New Zealand (under license). Sold at Costco
 Nobby's — peanuts and cashews, imported from fellow PepsiCo company, Smith's Chips in Australia
Poppa Jacks
 Red Rock Deli — imported from fellow PepsiCo company, Smith's Chips in Australia
 Ruffles — made in New Zealand (under license). Sold at Costco
 Smith Staxs — imported from fellow PepsiCo company, Smith's Chips in Australia
 Twisties — corn flavoured snacks
 Rashuns
 Popcorners - Popcorn snack

Discontinued brands

 Aztec Corn Chips — replaced with Doritos
 Biguns
  CC's corn chips — replaced with Doritos
 Party Corn Chips 
 Sensations
 Uncle Toby Chewy
 Krispa Chips
 Smiths Stax (In NZ)
 Roll Ups
 Le Snaks

References

External links

Food manufacturers of New Zealand
Food and drink companies based in Auckland
Manufacturing companies based in Auckland
PepsiCo subsidiaries
New Zealand brands